Claudio Schiavoni (born 14 November 1960) is an Italian racing driver currently competing in the FIA World Endurance Championship and the European Le Mans Series for Iron Lynx. Schiavoni previously competed in the Ferrari Challenge, Blancpain GT Sports Club and Michelin Le Mans Cup with Kessel Racing and Scuderia Niki. Schiavoni has competed in the Gulf 12 Hours three times, finishing 3rd in his class for Kessel Racing in 2016 and 2017.

Racing record

Racing career summary 

† As Schiavoni was a guest driver, he was ineligible to score championship points.

Complete 24 Hours of Le Mans results

Complete FIA World Endurance Championship results
(key) (Races in bold indicate pole position; races in italics indicate fastest lap)

* Season still in progress.

References

1960 births
Living people
Italian racing drivers
24 Hours of Le Mans drivers
European Le Mans Series drivers
Le Mans Cup drivers
Iron Lynx drivers
FIA World Endurance Championship drivers
WeatherTech SportsCar Championship drivers
Ferrari Challenge drivers